New Bullards Bar Dam is a variable radius concrete arch dam constructed in the early 1960s in California on the North Yuba River. The dam serves for irrigation, drinking water and hydroelectric power generation.

History

New Bullards Bar Dam was constructed by the Yuba County Water Agency. The agency was created through an act of the state legislature in 1959 specifically to construct a flood control reservoir in response to a flooding event in 1955. The bulk of the financing for the dam came from the issuance of revenue bonds. The dam was completed in 1969.

The dam is the fourth constructed on the Bullards Bar site, succeeding diversion dams built in 1899 and 1900 as well as a  concrete arch dam built by the Yuba River Power Company and transferred to Pacific Gas and Electric Company in 1922. The dam generated power from 1924 until its inundation by the New Bullards Bar Reservoir in 1969. Although the 1899 diversion dam was washed away, the 1900 dam is still in place about a quarter mile (0.4 km) downstream from the present dam.

Operations
New Bullards Bar Reservoir provides flood control space between September 15 and May 31 of each year.

The reservoir controls water flows from the North Yuba River, as well as from the Middle Yuba River and Oregon Creek via diversion tunnels. From here the combined waters of the Middle Yuba and Oregon Creek are sent west into a shorter  tunnel with a capacity of  into the eastern (Willow Creek) arm of New Bullards Bar Reservoir. The entire diversion and reservoir system is collectively known as the Yuba River Development Project.

Flood operations in the New Bullards Bar Reservoir water control manual are in part defined with being linked to operations in Marysville Dam. Marysville Dam was supposed to be built as part of a system of dams in the Sacramento Basin along with New Bullards Bar and Oroville Dam, but it was never built. Marysville Dam is still a defining function in the downstream channel capacity constraints even though it is non-existent.

The added distance increases the hydraulic head, i.e., elevation change. Its two Pelton wheels have a combined capacity of 340 megawatts and are the largest of their kind in the world. The small Fish Release powerhouse was constructed in 1986 at the base of the dam. It has a capacity of 150 kilowatts and generates power from water releases for fish on the Yuba River. Total annual generation at New Colgate Powerhouse is about 1,314,000 megawatt hours (MWh), while the Fish Release powerhouse produces 1,300 MWh.

The aforementioned 14-foot (4.3 m)-diameter penstock drains water from the New Bullards Bar Reservoir several miles through a mountain and down a large hill to deliver water to the New Colgate Powerhouse. In 2006 a 168-inch (4.3 m) butterfly valve was designed and manufactured in Europe for installation in the penstock at the top of the hill to protect the powerhouse from flooding in the event that an earthquake or other event caused the penstock to rupture. This valve uses a design similar to that of the dam's base release works.

Images

See also
Oroville Dam
List of dams and reservoirs in California
List of lakes in California
List of largest reservoirs of California
List of power stations in California
List of tallest dams in United States

References

External links
Yuba County Water Agency
New Bullards Bar Dam — Northern California Water Association

Dams in California
Dams in the Feather River basin
Yuba River
Arch dams
Buildings and structures in Yuba County, California
United States local public utility dams
Dams completed in 1969
1969 establishments in California
Hydroelectric power plants in California